OAO FGC UES is a state-owned energy company located in Moscow, Russia. It is the country's largest transmission grid company. The company is listed at the Moscow and London stock exchanges with 80.13% of shares owned by Rosseti.

History
In 2001, the Government of Russia reformed the Unified Energy System of Russia to create a unified national energy network, which includes a system of trunk lines, uniting most regions. For its operation, the Federal Grid Company (FGC UES) was created. 

In November 2001, the Board of Directors of RAO UES defined the stages of creation of FGC UES. The company was established on 25 January 2002 as a subsidiary of RAO UES. Charter capital of UES FGC was 127 billion roubles. It was paid in cash and by transmission grids owned by RAO UES. UES FGC was registered on 25 June 2002.

On 1 July 2008, FGC UES was divided off from RAO UES. At the same time, a single operating company was created by merging with 54 companies operating transmission systems of former regional power utilities. In November 2012, the majority of the company (79.55%) was transferred to the state controlled holding company Rosseti.

Operations
FGC UES owns, operates and supervise  of the transmission grids in Russia. It also provides services to the wholesale electricity market in Russia. It owns 8.57% stake in the energy company Inter RAO.

Shareholders
According to regulations, the Russian Government should control at least 75% plus one share of the company. , it controlled 80.13% through the holding company Rosseti and 0.59% through the holding company Rosimushchestvo, while 19.28% was owned by minority shareholders. These shares are freely traded at Moscow Exchange and London Stock Exchange.

See also

Energy policy of Russia

References

External links
 

Companies based in Moscow
Companies listed on the Moscow Exchange
Electric power transmission system operators in Russia
Companies established in 2002
2002 establishments in Russia
Government-owned companies of Russia